Marina Sergeevna Goliadkina (also transliterated from the Ukrainian language as Maryna Golyadkina; born 13 June 1997) is a Ukrainian-born Russian synchronised swimmer. She won team gold medals at the 2020 Summer Olympics, and at all world and European championships between 2017 and 2020.

Goliadkina was born in Donetsk, Ukraine, and between ages two and eight trained in rhythmic gymnastics. She then changed to synchronised swimming, and won a bronze medal at the 2013 World Aquatics Championships. She moved to Russia in August 2014 and received Russian citizenship in 2015.

Goliadkina's elder sister Diana is a 2010 European champion in team modern pentathlon. Their mother is a former Soviet champion in swimming.

References

External links
 
 

1997 births
Living people
Russian synchronized swimmers
World Aquatics Championships medalists in synchronised swimming
Synchronized swimmers at the 2013 World Aquatics Championships
Artistic swimmers at the 2019 World Aquatics Championships
European Aquatics Championships medalists in synchronised swimming
Synchronized swimmers at the 2020 Summer Olympics
Olympic synchronized swimmers of Russia
Olympic gold medalists for the Russian Olympic Committee athletes
Olympic medalists in synchronized swimming
Medalists at the 2020 Summer Olympics
Ukrainian emigrants to Russia
Sportspeople from Donetsk
Ukrainian synchronized swimmers